German submarine U-389 was a Type VIIC U-boat of Nazi Germany's Kriegsmarine during World War II.

She carried out one patrol. She did not sink or damage any ships.

She was sunk by a British aircraft southwest of Iceland on 4 October 1943.

Design
German Type VIIC submarines were preceded by the shorter Type VIIB submarines. U-389 had a displacement of  when at the surface and  while submerged. She had two shafts and two  propellers.

U-389 was fitted with five  torpedo tubes (four fitted at the bow and one at the stern), fourteen torpedoes, one  SK C/35 naval gun, 220 rounds, and two twin  C/30 anti-aircraft guns. The boat had a complement of between forty-four and sixty.

Service history
The submarine was laid down on 3 December 1941 at the Howaldtswerke (yard) at Flensburg as yard number 20, launched on 19 December 1942 and commissioned on 6 February 1943 under the command of Kapitänleutnant Siegfried Heilmann.

The boat was a member of one wolfpack.

She served with the 5th U-boat Flotilla from 6 February 1943 and the 9th flotilla from 1 August of the same year.

Patrol and loss
After moving briefly between Kiel, Bergen and Trondheim, U-389 set-off from the latter on 18 September 1943. Passing through the gap that separates Iceland and the Faroe Islands, she was attacked and sunk by depth charges dropped from a British Liberator of No. 120 Squadron RAF on 4 October 1943.

50 men died in the U-boat; there were no survivors.

Previously recorded fate
U-389 was noted as sunk on 5 October 1943 southwest of Iceland in the Denmark Strait by a RAF Liberator of 269 Squadron.

Wolfpacks
U-389 took part in one wolfpack, namely:
 Rossbach (24 September – 4 October 1943)

References

Bibliography

External links

German Type VIIC submarines
U-boats commissioned in 1943
U-boats sunk in 1943
1942 ships
Ships built in Kiel
Ships lost with all hands
U-boats sunk by depth charges
U-boats sunk by British aircraft
World War II shipwrecks in the Arctic Ocean
World War II submarines of Germany
Maritime incidents in October 1943